Judith Cladel, (March 25, 1873 – January 29, 1958) was a French playwright, novelist, biographer and journalist.

Life and career
Born and lived in Paris, she was a member of the jury of the prix Femina from 1916 to 1958. She began to write at a very young age, encouraged by her father, the novelist Léon Cladel. Her first work was the play Le Volant, performed at the Théâtre de l'Oeuvre in 1895 when she was 22 years old. Léon Cladel died when Judith was 19 years old. As her father's friend and her future lover, Edmond Picard predicted, Cladel was entrusted by her family with upkeeping his memory. Judith Cladel is the author of two biographical works about the life and work of her father. Her next biographies focused on the sculptor, Auguste Rodin. Her biography Rodin, sa vie glorieuse, sa vie inconnue is her best known work and was considered the authoritative biography of the sculptor for over 50 years. She played a key role in the founding of the Musée Rodin in 1916.

Works
 Le Volant: Pièce en trois actes, Paris, Alphonse Lemerre, 1895
 Les Confessions d’une amante, Paris, Mercure de France, 1905
 La Vie de Léon Cladel, Paris, Alphose Lemerre, 1905
 Auguste Rodin, l'homme et l'oeuvre, Bruxelles, Libr. Nat. d'Art et d'Histoire, 1908
 Portraits d'Hier--Maurice Rollinat, Paris, 1910
 Rodin, sa vie glorieuse, sa vie inconnue, Paris, Grasset, 1936
 Aristide Maillol: sa vie, son oeuvre, ses idées, Paris, Grasset, 1937
 Maître et discipline: Charles Baudelaires et Léon Cladel, Paris, Corrêa, 1951

See also
 Léonce Bénédite

References

Aron, Paul et Cécile Vanderpelen-Diagre, Edmond Picard: Un bourgeois socialiste belge à la fin du dix-neuvième siècle, Bruxelles: Musées royaux des Beaux-Arts de Belgique, 2013. 
Irvine, Margot, « Une Académie de femmes? », dans M. IRVINE (dir.), Les réseaux des femmes de lettres au XIXe siècle, @nalyses, printemps-été 2008
Van de Kerckhove, Fabrice, ed., Edmond Picard - Léon Cladel. Lettres de France et de Belgique (1881–1889), Bruxelles: Archives et musée de la littérature, 2009. 318-322.

External links

 

1873 births
1958 deaths
French women novelists